Gianni Colombo (Milan, 1933 – Melzo, 3 February 1993) was an Italian artist, member of the kinetic art movement.

In the 1960s, Colombo attended Accademia di Brera in Milan, where he met Davide Boriani, Gabriele De Vecchi, Giovanni Anceschi and Grazia Varisco. Together they formed "Gruppo T", a collective of artists interested in investigating the relationship between images and movement and the participatory element of art through kinetic forms.

Through his work Colombo dealt mainly with the perception of space, creating architectural environments and using a variety of supports including mechanical ones. He was awarded the Grand Prize of the Venice Biennale of 1968 with one of its most famous works, elastic space.

In 1985 he becomes director of Accademia di Brera where he also taught. In 1986 Colombo expanded his activities to theatre (he was a set designer for the Operstheater in Frankfurt) and architecture.

External links 
 Archive Gianni Colombo
 Gianni Colombo, "Art in America", 19 June 2013

Bibliographical references 
 Documenta IV. Catalogue of the exhibition, Kassel 1968.
  Kimpel, Harald / Stengel, Karin: documenta IV 1968, Internationale Ausstellung. Eine fotografische Rekonstruktion, Bremen 2007, .
 Carolyn Christov-Bakargiev  and Marcella Beccaria (eds), Gianni Colombo. Castello di Rivoli, Museo d'Arte Contemporanea   2009. Milano, Skira, 2009, .

References

1937 births
1993 deaths
20th-century Italian painters
20th-century male artists
Italian male painters
21st-century Italian painters
Italian contemporary artists
Brera Academy alumni
Academic staff of Brera Academy
Op art
Olivetti people